The fifth season of Reba, an American television sitcom series, aired on The WB from September 16, 2005 to May 5, 2006. The season consisted of 22 episodes. 

The show was broadcast during 2005–06 television season on Fridays at 9 pm. The season averaged 3.4 million viewers. This was final season to air on The WB before the channel merged with UPN to form The CW. The entire season was released on DVD in North America on January 13, 2009.

Main Cast
 Reba McEntire as Reba Hart
 Christopher Rich as Brock Hart
 Melissa Peterman as Barbara Jean Hart
 JoAnna Garcia as Cheyenne Montgomery
 Steve Howey as Van Montgomery
 Scarlett Pomers as Kyra Hart (due to Pomers being treated for anorexia nervosa; Pomers appeared in only 3 of the season's 22 episodes)
 Mitch Holleman as Jake Hart

Episodes

Home media

References

2005 American television seasons
2006 American television seasons
Reba (TV series) seasons